Deng Shudi (born September 10, 1991) is a Chinese artistic gymnast. He competed for the Chinese national team at the 2014 and 2015 World Championships.

World Championships
At the 2014 World Artistic Gymnastics Championships in Nanning, China, Deng competed on all six apparatuses in the Men's Team Final, contributing a total score of 89.914 to the team's first-place finish. Individually, he finished sixth in the all-around with a score of 89.732 and fourth on parallel bars with a score of 15.666.

In 2015, Deng competed at the 2015 World Artistic Gymnastics Championships in Glasgow. In the team final, Deng competed on floor (14.966), rings (14.600), vault (15.233) and parallel bars (16.066), contributing to the Chinese team's third-place finish behind Japan and Great Britain. He came third in the individual all-around with a score of 90.099, which was The first medal in men's all-around at World Championships or Olympics level for China since Yang Wei won the all-around title at the 2008 Beijing Olympics seven years ago. Deng also tied with Oleg Stepko for a bronze medal on parallel bars, and finished fourth on floor exercise.

In 2018, he won the Artistic Gymnastics Men's Rings with the score of 14.750 at the 18th Asian Games in Jakarta, Indonesia.

References

External links

1991 births
Living people
Medalists at the World Artistic Gymnastics Championships
Chinese male artistic gymnasts
Gymnasts at the 2016 Summer Olympics
2016 Olympic bronze medalists for China
Olympic gymnasts of China
Olympic medalists in gymnastics
Gymnasts at the 2018 Asian Games
Medalists at the 2018 Asian Games
Asian Games gold medalists for China
Asian Games medalists in gymnastics
People from Guiyang
Gymnasts from Guizhou
21st-century Chinese people